Al-Batani al-Gharbi was a Palestinian village in the Gaza Subdistrict. It was depopulated during the 1947–48 Civil War in Mandatory Palestine on May 13, 1948, by the Giv'ati Brigade under Operation Barak. It was located 36 km northeast of Gaza.

History
One  mention of al-Batani indicates that it was founded as a ranch by the Umayyad caliph Mu'awiyah I in the 8th century CE.

Ottoman era
The village appeared as an unnamed village on the map that  Pierre Jacotin compiled of the area in 1799.

In 1838,  Robinson noted el-Butaniyeh, the west, as Muslim village  located in the Gaza district.

In 1863 the French explorer Victor Guérin found the village, which he called Bathanieh el-Gharbieh, to have 400 inhabitants. He further noted three grey white mutilated marble columns by the well. By the well, there were oxen which made the water rise in a huge bucket.  Guérin noted that he had seen a similar system several other places in Palestine, as well as in Tunis.

An Ottoman village list of about 1870 indicated 91 houses and a population of  247, though  the population count included men, only.

In 1882, the PEF's  Survey of Western Palestine  described the two Butani villages as being made of adobe and "situated on low ground, with patches of garden and wells. The western one has also a pond."

British Mandate era
According to the  1922 census of Palestine conducted  by the British Mandate authorities, Al-Batani al-Gharbi had a population of 556 inhabitants, all Muslims. which had increased in  the 1931 census  to 667, still all Muslim.

The population in the 1945 statistics  was 980 Muslims, with 4,574  dunams of land, according to an official land and population survey.  Of this, 170  dunams were used for citrus and banana plants, 95 were for  plantations and irrigable land, 4,152 used for cereals, while 34  dunams were classified as built-up land.

Al-Batani al-Gharbi had an elementary school for boys founded in 1947 and it had an initial enrollment of 119 students. The village had one mosque.

1948, aftermath
In early May, 1948,  the  Al-Majdal Arab National Committee, (NC), ordered the villagers of Al-Batani al-Gharbi, together with those of Al-Batani al-Sharqi, Yasur,  Bayt Daras and the three Sawafir villages to stay put.

Al-Batani al-Gharbi became depopulated as part of Palmach's   'Operation Lightning' (Mivtza Barak). The objective was to compel the Arab inhabitants of the area to 'move' and by striking one or more population centres to cause an exodus, which was foreseen given the wave of panic that was sweeping Arab communities after the Deir Yassin massacre. After Haganah had hit  Bayt Daras, the operational orders to them on the 10 May was to "subdue" Al-Batani al-Gharbi and Al-Batani al-Sharqi, "with the same means used vis-à-vis Aqir, Bashshit and Bayt Daras."

The village was depopulated around May 13, 1948. Following the war the area was incorporated into the State of Israel. 
In early 1949 American Quaker relief workers reported that many those living in tents in what became Maghazi refugee camp had come from Al-Batani al-Gharbi.

In 1992 the village site was described:  "Cactuses and fig and sycamore trees grow on the site, and some of the village street are still clearly recognizable. The adjacent land is partially cultivated by the nearby kibbutz. A stone quarry is also located on village lands."

References

Bibliography

External links
Welcome To al-Batani al-Gharbi
al-Batani al-Gharbi,  Zochrot
Survey of Western Palestine, Map 16:   IAA, Wikimedia commons
al-Batani al-Gharbi, from the Khalil Sakakini Cultural Center

Arab villages depopulated during the 1948 Arab–Israeli War
District of Gaza